is a passenger railway station in located in the city of Iwade, Wakayama Prefecture, Japan, operated by West Japan Railway Company (JR West).

Lines
Funato Station is served by the Wakayama Line, and is located 75.3 kilometers from the terminus of the line at Ōji Station.

Station layout
The station consists of two opposed side platforms connected by an open footbridge. The station is unattended.

Platforms

Adjacent stations

|-

History
Funato Station opened on January 1,1899 on the Kiwa Railway. The line was sold to the Kansai Railway in 1904, which was subsequently nationalized in 1907. With the privatization of the Japan National Railways (JNR) on April 1, 1987, the station came under the aegis of the West Japan Railway Company.

Passenger statistics
In fiscal 2019, the station was used by an average of 256 passengers daily (boarding passengers only).

Surrounding Area
Omiya Shrine
Iwade City Iwade Elementary School
old Yamato Kaido
Funatoyama Kofun

See also
List of railway stations in Japan

References

External links

 Funato Station Official Site

Railway stations in Wakayama Prefecture
Railway stations in Japan opened in 1899
Iwade, Wakayama